Dharam Singh (born 15 February 1936) (Gurmukhi: ਧਰਮ ਸਿੰਘ ਨਿਹੰਗ ਸਿੰਘ, Devnagri:धरम सिंघ निहंग सिंघ) is a Nihang theologian, writer, preacher known for exegesis and expositions of Adi Granth and Dasam Granth. Enrolled as Nihang in Budha Dal, he worked as a secretary and participated in various religious conventions. He contributed the view of Sikh Religion on Human Rights in German Book, Menschenrechte im Weltkontext. In February 2015, he was the very first speaker of the dialogue series entitled Religion Matters established by the German Federal Ministry of Economic Cooperation and Development (BMZ). On letter call from SGPC, he had written various articles in response to Gurbaksh Singh Kala Afghana, who spoke against Amrit and Dasam Granth.

He started Sachkhoj Academy which provides platform for independent researchers of Gurbani to perform unbiased research, and learning to use the Adi Granth dictionary lexical resource for the exegesis.

Early life and education
He was born at Manupur-Goslan, Khanna, Punjab to Bhagwan Singh and Harnam Kaur. At Khanna, he had his primary education and matriculated from AS High School in 1954. In 1956, he completed his Intermediate with Hindi as his major.

Life and works at Buddha Dal
He belongs to a Nihang family. His paternal uncles (Taya and Chacha) and first cousin served as Nihang in Budha Dal. His taya was jathedar of Budha Dal, Samrala Circle. Among others, Dharam Singh used to have discussions on Banis in Das Granthi with his coeval nephew.

In 1960, Dharam Singh began to participate in religious gatherings called Jorh Melas, with Budha Dal. In 1962, he enrolled as a Nihang in Budha Dal at Hola Mohalla function in Anandpur Sahib, after Akhand Path of Dasam Granth.

He served as a secretary in the Dal, which was under command of Akali Chet Singh, and used to manage ledgers and other paper work, being among the most formally educated in the Dal during that time. In 1965, he participated in Path Antar Masla and Pothi Mangal conventions along with Buddha Dal representations and offered various suggestions on both topics

Gurbani research and Sachkhoj Academy
He continued his research of Gurbani, led by the guidance in it such as, ਏਨਾ ਅਖਰਾ ਮਹਿ ਜੋ ਗੁਰਮੁਖਿ ਬੂਝੈ ਤਿਸੁ ਸਿਰਿ ਲੇਖੁ ਨ ਹੋਈ ॥੨॥(Adi Granth, 432) and ਬਿਦਿਆ ਸੋਧੈ ਤਤੁ ਲਹੈ ਰਾਮ ਨਾਮ ਲਿਵ ਲਾਇ॥ (Adi Granth, 938): he concluded that Gurbani is self-contained and that it provides its own explanations by itself. That the exposition of Gurbani can only be conducted best taking the ‘formless being’ as focal point, and not like the way the subject has been treated in the previous Expositions.

From 1970-92, he had discourses with people of various religious affiliations like Yogis, Bairagis, Kabirpanthis, Muslims, Pundits etc., during his stay in Garhmukteshwar, (Uttar Pradesh). In 1992, he returned to Khanna and started Gurmat classes on request of Bhai Iqbal Singh of Missionary College aftertheir mutual discussions. In 1994, Sachkhoj Academy came into being.

Literary works

Books
 Naad Ved Vichar - Punjabi Language, Teeka of Japji Sahib
 Sahij Samadhi Banaam Sunn Samadhi - Punjabi Language, Teeka of Sidh Goshti
 Menschenrechte im Weltkontext - German Language, on Human Rights in Sikh Religion
 Jaap Sahib - Punjabi Language, c.2015 Dalbara Singh Pannu, on refined Teeka/ translation of Jaap Sahib

Articles
On request of SGPC, he had written various research articles which were published in Gurmat Prakash and also various magazines in Sikh world. Following are list of articles, taken from 50 Year History of Gurmat Prakash:

References

External links
 Read literature of Nihang Dharam Singh

Nihang
Scholars of Sikhism
Sikh writers
1936 births
Living people